La Lanterna di Vittorio is a cafe and pizzeria at 129 MacDougal Street, Greenwich Village, New York City. The restaurant is situated in a restored townhouse and serves Italian cuisine. It is noted for its Bar Next Door room in the basement which hosts regular live jazz and rock performances. The basement is characterized by "low ceilings, and exposed brick and romantic lighting". In 2007, Jazz Education Journal referred to it as "One of NYC's great secrets for a first-class jazz experience." The Jonathan Kreisberg Trio are regular performers at the clubs on Wednesdays.

See also 
 Eve's Hangout by Eva Kotchever

References

Jazz clubs in New York City
Restaurants in Manhattan
Italian restaurants in New York City
Music venues in Manhattan
Greenwich Village